St John the Evangelist's Church is in Walton, Warrington, Cheshire, England. It was built as a private estate church towards the end of the 19th century but is now an active Anglican parish church in the diocese of Chester, the archdeaconry of Chester and the deanery of Great Budworth. The church is recorded in the National Heritage List for England as a designated Grade II* listed building.

History

The church was built in 1882–83 for the brewer Sir Gilbert Greenall of Walton Hall. It was designed by the Lancaster architects Paley and Austin, the cost of its construction being £17,500
(equivalent to £ in ).

Architecture

Exterior

The church is built in red snecked sandstone with Westmorland green slate roofs. Its plan is cruciform with a three-bay nave, north and south transepts, a two-bay chancel, a south vestry, and a south porch. The tower is in four stages with chequerwork in its third stage, a recessed octagonal spire and an octagonal north west stair turret. The porch consists of an oak frame on a  sandstone plinth. The church is in Decorated style.

Interior

The nave and chancels have barrel roofs. On the south side of the chancel is sedilia. The reredos contains a carving of the Crucifixion. The font is marble, and the pulpit is built of oak on a stone base. The floors are tiled. The stained glass includes a window in the south transept dated 1929 by Morris and Co. and elsewhere by E. H. Jewitt of Shrigley and Hunt.

Appraisal
The church was listed at Grade II* on 23 December 1983. Grade II* is the middle of the three gradings designated by English Heritage, and is given to "particularly important buildings of more than special interest". The authors of the Buildings of England series describe it as a "glorious estate church, exquisitely detailed and composed", and consider that the tower is one of Austin's best.

External features

The lych gate dating from around 1885 is built in red sandstone with a Westmorland green slate roof and half-timbered gables on brackets. It was built at the expense of Sir Gilbert Greenall and was designed by Paley and Austin. It is listed at Grade II.

See also

Grade I and II* listed buildings in Warrington
Listed buildings in Walton, Cheshire
List of ecclesiastical works by Paley and Austin

References

Church of England church buildings in Cheshire
Grade II* listed churches in Cheshire
Churches in Warrington
Gothic Revival church buildings in England
Gothic Revival architecture in Cheshire
Churches completed in 1885
19th-century Church of England church buildings
Anglican Diocese of Liverpool
Paley and Austin buildings